Lauten Audio, based in northern California, United States, is a designer and manufacturer of microphones and related equipment. Lauten Audio coined the term Multi-voicing™ which is a unique functionality where the sound characteristics of a microphone can be manipulated via switches or knobs to change its timbre without the use of external hardware.

Lauten Audio released their first product the multi-purpose “Horizon Tube Microphone” in October 2006.
List of microphone manufacturers

External links 
 Lauten Audio Website
 Lauten Audio Blog

References 

Music equipment manufacturers
Microphone manufacturers
Audio equipment manufacturers of the United States